The epiploic appendices (or appendices epiploicae, or epiploic appendages, or appendix epiploica, or omental appendices) are small pouches of the peritoneum filled with fat and situated along the colon, but are absent in the rectum.

They are chiefly appended to the transverse and sigmoid parts of the colon, however, their function is unknown.

The appendages can become inflamed in a painful process known as epiploic appendagitis which can mimic acute appendicitis and other conditions.

External links
  - "Intestines and Pancreas: Large Intestine"
 
 
"Michael Sand et al. : Epiploic appendagitis – clinical characteristics of an uncommon surgical diagnosis BMC Surgery 2007, 7:11 (1 July 2007)".

Pelvis